Soo-kyung, also spelled Soo-kyeong or Su-kyung, is a Korean unisex given name, predominantly feminine. Its meaning differs based on the hanja used to write each syllable of the name. There are 67 hanja with the reading "soo" and 54 hanja with the reading "kyung" on the South Korean government's official list of hanja which may be registered for use in given names.

People with this name include:

Arts and literature
Sumi Jo (born Jo Soo-kyung, 1962), South Korean female opera singer
Heo Su-gyeong (born 1964), South Korean male poet
SEO (artist) (born Seo Soo-kyoung, 1977), South Korean female painter
Sue Son (Korean name Son Sue-kyung; born 1985), South Korean-born British female violinist
Hong Soo-kyung, South Korean female cellist, member of the Trio con Brio Copenhagen

Entertainers
Jeon Soo-kyung (born 1966), South Korean theatre and film actress
Lee Soo-kyung (born 1982), South Korean actress
Yoon Jin-seo (born Yoon Soo-kyung, 1983), South Korean actress
Lee Soo-kyung (actress born 1996), South Korean actress
Ri Su-kyong, North Korean female singer, member of Moranbong Band

Sportspeople
Yoon Soo-kyung (born 1964), South Korean female handball player
Ha Su-gyeong (born 1969), South Korean female swimmer
Kim Soo-kyung (baseball) (born 1979), South Korean male baseball pitcher
Kim Soo-kyung (weightlifter) (born 1985), South Korean female weightlifter
Ahn Soo-kyeong (born 1987), South Korean female sport shooter

Others
Lim Su-kyung (born 1968), South Korean female politician

See also
List of Korean given names

References

External links
Page for the name "수경" on erumy.com

Korean unisex given names